Timotej Královič (born 26 October 1996) is a Slovak footballer who plays for Sokol Lanžhot as a midfielder

Club career

FK Senica
He made his Fortuna Liga debut for Senica against Žilina on 10 May 2014.

References

External links
 
 FK Senica profile
 Eurofotbal profile

1996 births
Living people
Slovak footballers
Slovak expatriate footballers
Association football midfielders
FK Senica players
FC Spartak Trnava players
FC Neded players
OFK Malženice players
TJ Sokol Lanžhot players
Slovak Super Liga players
2. Liga (Slovakia) players
3. Liga (Slovakia) players
Czech Fourth Division players
Expatriate footballers in the Czech Republic
Slovak expatriate sportspeople in the Czech Republic